Shaheed Lateef (11 June 1913 – 16 April 1967) was Hindi film director, writer, and producer. He was the maker of films like Ziddi (1948) which launched Dev Anand's career and Arzoo (1950) starring Dilip Kumar and Kamini Kaushal.

Early life and background
He was born in Chandausi, United Provinces of Agra and Oudh and studied at Aligarh Muslim University. Here he not just befriended Saadat Hasan Manto, but also Ismat Chughtai (1915–1991). They married in 1941, and later had two daughters.

Career
Lateef shifted to Bombay (now Mumbai) and started his career with Bombay Talkies, a noted film studio of Hindi film industry, where he wrote dialogues for Ashok Kumar-starrer, Naya Sansar (1941), followed by Amiya Chakravarty's Anjaan (1941) and Gyan Mukherjee's Jhoola (1941). This led to his directorial debut with Ziddi (1948), on a story by Ismat Chughtai. The film also established the career of actor Dev Anand. The husband wife duo worked together on many films, where Ismat was sometimes a scenarist, a writer or at times even producer.

He died in Mumbai, Maharashtra on 16 April 1967.

Filmography

 Jawab Ayega (1968) - Director
 Baharen Phir Bhi Aayengi (1966) - Director
 Picnic (1966) - Director
 Sone Ki Chidiya (1958) - Director
 Society (1955) - Director
 Darwaza (1954) - Director
 Fareb (1953) - Director
 Sheesha (1952) - Director
 Buzdil (1951) - Director
 Arzoo (1950) - Director
 Shikayat (1948) - Director
 Ziddi (1948) - Director
 Anjaan (1941) - Dialogue
 Jhoola (1941)  - Screenwriter, Dialogue
 Naya Sansar (1941) - Dialogue

References

External links
 

1913 births
1967 deaths
20th-century Indian Muslims
20th-century Indian film directors
Hindi-language film directors
Indian male screenwriters
Film producers from Uttar Pradesh
Aligarh Muslim University alumni
People from Sambhal district
Film directors from Uttar Pradesh
20th-century Indian screenwriters
20th-century Indian male writers